Josef Alfred Börjesson (15 April 1891 – 20 February 1971) was a Swedish amateur footballer who competed in the 1912 Summer Olympics for Team Sweden. He played as goalkeeper, and featured in one match in the main tournament as well as one match in the consolation tournament.

References

External links
 Swedish squad in 1912

1891 births
1971 deaths
Swedish footballers
Sweden international footballers
Olympic footballers of Sweden
Footballers at the 1912 Summer Olympics
Association football goalkeepers
Footballers from Gothenburg